The International Day Against Drug Abuse and Illicit Trafficking is a United Nations International Day against drug abuse and the illegal drug trade. It is observed annually on 26 June, since 1989. The date June 26 is to commemorate Lin Zexu's dismantling of the opium trade in Humen, Guangdong, ending on June 25, 1839，just before the First Opium War in China. The observance was instituted by General Assembly Resolution 42/112 of 7 December 1987.

On 26 June 1987, two important texts (Comprehensive Multidisciplinary Outline of Future Activities in Drug Abuse Control & Declaration of the International Conference on Drug Abuse and Illicit Trafficking) were adopted at the International Conference on Drug Abuse and Illicit Trafficking, which was held in Vienna during 17–26 June 1987. The Conference recommended that an annual day should be observed to mark the importance of the fight against drug abuse and illicit trafficking. Both the dates 17 June and 26 June were suggested, and in the later meetings 26 June was chosen and written into the draft and final resolution.

It is often referred to by Anti-Drug campaigners as 6/26. A play on Marijuana smokers "4/20" day to celebrate cannabis.

The UN's 2007 World Drug Report
puts the value of the illegal drug trade at US$322 billion a year.

Campaigns, rallies, poster designing and many other programs are conducted. People of different countries celebrate the day together. As drug use increases, the day becomes more important.

‘Health for Justice. Justice for Health’, the theme for International Day against Drug Abuse and Illicit Trafficking 2019, highlights that “justice and health are two sides of the same coin when it comes to addressing drug problems.”

"Support. Don't punish." campaign
Since 2013, a campaign called "Support. Don't punish" has been associated with the 26 June. Coordinated by the International Drug Policy Consortium, it demands that approaches to drug policy be focused on health, human rights, and the end of the criminalization of people who use drugs.

References

External links
 UN homepage for International Day against Drug Abuse and Illicit Trafficking
 German Lopez, "The violent history of International Anti-Drug Day", Vox, 26 June 2014.
 "International Day Against Drug Abuse and Trafficking Updated"

Drug policy
United Nations days
June observances